Máté Skriba (born 13 March 1992 in Celldömölk) is a Hungarian football player who currently plays for FC Ajka on loan from Haladás.

Career statistics

References
Haladas FC
Illes Academia
HLSZ
UEFA Official Website

1992 births
Living people
People from Celldömölk
Hungarian footballers
Association football forwards
Szombathelyi Haladás footballers
MTK Budapest FC players
FC Tatabánya players
FC Ajka players
Veszprém LC footballers
Budafoki LC footballers
Nemzeti Bajnokság I players
Sportspeople from Vas County